The 2018 San Diego Padres season was the 50th season of the San Diego Padres franchise. The Padres played their home games at Petco Park as members of Major League Baseball's National League West Division.

Offseason
On December 12, 2017, the first day of the MLB Winter Meetings, the Padres traded Jabari Blash to the New York Yankees for Chase Headley and Bryan Mitchell. This will be Headley's second stint with the Padres, having played with them to start his career. To make room in the 40-man roster for both players, the Padres traded Ryan Schimpf to the Tampa Bay Rays for minor leaguer Deion Tansel.

On February 19, 2018, the Padres signed free agent 1B Eric Hosmer to an 8-year, $144 million contract. This was the largest contract in franchise history.

Roster

Season standings

National League West

National League Wildcard

Record vs. opponents

Game log

|-style=background:#fbb
|1||March 29|| Brewers || 1–2 (12) || Jeffress (1–0) || Cimber (0–1) || Barnes (1) || 44,649 || 0–1 || L1
|-style=background:#fbb
|2||March 30|| Brewers || 6–8 || Drake (1–0) || Hand (0–1) || Knebel (1) || 31,513 || 0–2 || L2
|-style=background:#fbb
|3||March 31|| Brewers || 3–7  || Suter (1–0) || Perdomo (0–1) ||—|| 35,106 || 0–3 || L3
|-

|-style=background:#fbb
|4||April 2|| Rockies || 4–7 || Bettis (1–0) || Mitchell (0–1) || Davis (2) || 16,899 || 0–4 || L4
|-style=background:#bfb
|5||April 3|| Rockies || 8–4 || Ross (1–0) || Freeland (0–1) || Hand (1)|| 19,283 || 1–4 || W1
|-style=background:#fbb
|6||April 4|| Rockies || 2–5 || Gray (1–1) || Richard (0–1) || Davis (3) || 19,698 || 1–5 || L1
|-style=background:#fbb
|7||April 5|| Rockies || 1–3 || Ottavino (1–0) || Hand (0–2) || Davis (4) || 20,509 || 1–6 || L2
|-style=background:#bfb
|8||April 6||@ Astros || 4–1 || Perdomo (1–1) || McCullers Jr. (1–1) || Hand (2) || 41,138 || 2–6 || W1
|-style=background:#fbb
|9||April 7||@ Astros || 0–1(10) || Devenski (1–0) || Erlin (0–1) ||—|| 42,306 || 2–7 || L1
|-style=background:#fbb
|10||April 8||@ Astros || 1–4 || Morton (2–0) || Ross (1–1) || Peacock (1) || 37,093 || 2–8 || L2
|-style=background:#bfb
|11||April 9||@ Rockies || 7–6 || Richard (1–1) || Gray (1–2) || Hand (3) || 20,291 || 3–8 || W1
|-style=background:#bfb
|12||April 10||@ Rockies || 5–2 || Lucchesi (1–0) || Shaw (1–1) || Hand (4) || 22,446 || 4–8 || W2
|-style=background:#fbb
|13||April 11||@ Rockies || 4–6 || Senzatela (1–1) || Baumann (0–1) || Davis (5) || 21,248 || 4–9 || L1
|-style=background:#fbb
|14||April 12|| Giants || 0–7 || Stratton (1–1) || Mitchell (0–2) ||—|| 22,288 || 4–10 || L2
|-style=background:#bfb
|15||April 13|| Giants || 5–1 || Ross (2–1) || Blach (1–2) || Hand (5) || 31,675 || 5–10 || W1
|-style=background:#bfb
|16||April 14|| Giants || 5–4 || Cimber (1–1) || Gearrin (0–1) || Hand (6) || 41,117 || 6–10 || W2
|-style=background:#bfb
|17||April 15|| Giants || 10–1 || Lucchesi (2–0) || Beede (0–1) ||—|| 34,316 || 7–10 || W3
|-style=background:#fbb
|18||April 16|| Dodgers || 3–10 || Ryu (2–0) || Erlin (0–2) ||—|| 23,082 || 7–11 || L1
|-style=background:#fbb
|19||April 17|| Dodgers || 3–7(10) || Alexander (1–0) || Webb (0–1) ||—|| 22,959 || 7–12 || L2
|-style=background:#fbb
|20||April 18|| Dodgers || 4–13 || Maeda (2–1) || Perdomo (1–2) ||—|| 23,748 || 7–13 || L3
|-style=background:#bfb
|21||April 20||@ Diamondbacks || 4–1 || Hand (1–2) || Boxberger (0–2) ||—|| 24,902 || 8–13 || W1
|-style=background:#fbb
|22||April 21||@ Diamondbacks || 2–6 || Godley (3–1) || Richard (1–2) ||—|| 38,820 || 8–14 || L1
|-style=background:#fbb
|23||April 22||@ Diamondbacks || 2–4 || Corbin (4–0) || Lucchesi (2–1) || Bradley (2) || 31,061 || 8–15 || L2
|-style=background:#bfb
|24||April 23||@ Rockies || 13–5 || Erlin (1–2) || McGee (0–1) ||—|| 24,419 || 9–15 || W1
|-style=background:#fbb
|25||April 24||@ Rockies || 0–8 || Freeland (1–3) || Lauer (0–1) ||—|| 23,727 || 9–16 || L1
|-style=background:#fbb
|26||April 25||@ Rockies || 2–5 || Gray (2–4) || Ross (2–2) ||—|| 32,989 || 9–17 || L2
|-style=background:#fbb
|27||April 27|| Mets || 1–5 || deGrom (3–0) || Richard (1–3) ||—|| 29,977 || 9–18 || L3
|-style=background:#bfb
|28||April 28|| Mets || 12–2 || Lucchesi (3–1) || Vargas (0–1) ||—|| 42,778 || 10–18 || W1
|-style=background:#fbb
|29||April 29|| Mets || 2–14 || Wheeler (2–1) || Mitchell (0–3) ||—|| 34,639 || 10–19 || L1
|-style=background:#fbb
|30||April 30||@ Giants || 5–6 || Johnson (1–1) || Hand (1–3) ||—|| 35,470 || 10–20 || L2
|-

|-style=background:#bfb
|31||May 1||@ Giants || 3–2 || Yates (1–0) || Strickland (2–1) || Hand (7) || 36,735 || 11–20 || W1
|-style=background:#fbb
|32||May 2||@ Giants || 4–9 || Holland (1–3) || Richard (1–4) ||—|| 36,475 || 11–21 || L1
|-style=background:#fbb
|33||May 4|| Dodgers || 0–4 || Buehler (2–0) || Lucchesi (3–2) ||—|| 21,536 || 11–22 || L2
|-style=background:#bfb
|34||May 5|| Dodgers || 7–4 || Yates (2–0) || Fields (2–1) || Hand (8) || 21,791 || 12–22 || W1
|-style=background:#bfb
|35||May 6|| Dodgers || 3–0 || Lauer (1–1) || Cingrani (0–2) || Hand (9) || 21,789 || 13–22 || W2
|-style=background:#fbb
|36||May 7|| Nationals || 5–8 || Strasburg (4–3) || Ross (2–3) ||—|| 17,296 || 13–23 || L1
|-style=background:#fbb
|37||May 8|| Nationals || 0–4 || Hellickson (1–0) || Richard (1–5) || — || 18,989 || 13–24 || L2
|-style=background:#bfb
|38||May 9|| Nationals || 2–1 || Stammen  (1–0) || Gott (0–2) || Hand (10) || 18,804 || 14–24 || W1
|-style=background:#fbb
|39||May 10|| Cardinals || 1–2 || Mikolas (5–0) || Lyles (0–1) || Bud Norris (8) || 20,515 || 14–25 || L1
|-style=background:#fbb
|40||May 11|| Cardinals || 5–9 || Weaver (3–2)
| Lauer (1–2)
|—|| 28,207 || 14–26 || L2
|-style=background:#bfb
|41||May 12|| Cardinals || 2–1 (13) || Cimber (2–1) || Brebbia (0–1) ||—|| 32,715 || 15–26 || W1
|-style=background:#bfb
|42||May 13|| Cardinals || 5–3 || Richard (2–5) || Wainwright (1–3) || Hand (11) || 28,183 || 16–26 || W2
|-style=background:#fbb
|43||May 14|| Rockies || 4–6 || Anderson (3–1) || Makita (0–1) || Davis (15) || 17,245 || 16–27 || L1
|-style=background:#bfb
|44||May 15|| Rockies || 4–0 || Lyles (1–1) || Marquez (2–5) || Hand (12) || 19,598 || 17–27 || W1
|-style=background:#fbb
|45||May 17||@ Pirates || 4–5 || Santana (2–0) || Strahm (0–1) || Vázquez (9) || 11,404 || 17–28 || L1
|-style=background:#bfb
|46||May 18||@ Pirates || 3–2 || Ross (3–3) || Nova (2–4) || Hand (13) || 18,920 || 18–28 || W1
|-style=background:#bfb
|47||May 19||@ Pirates || 6–2 || Richard (3–5) || Kingham (2–1) || — || 20,578 || 19–28 || W2
|-style=background:#bfb
|47||May 20||@ Pirates || 8–5 || Yates (3–0) || Vázquez (2–1) || Hand (14) || 17,783 || 20–28 || W3
|-style=background:#fbb
|49||May 21||@ Nationals || 2–10 || González (5–2) || Erlin (1–3) || — || 27,890 || 20–29 || L1
|-style=background:#fbb
|50||May 22||@ Nationals || 1–2 || Doolittle (2–2) || Strahm (0–2) || — || 25,700 || 20–30 || L2
|-style=background:#bfb
|51||May 23||@ Nationals || 3–1 || Ross (4–3) || Fedde (0–1) || Hand (15) || 31,076 || 21–30 ||  W1
|-style=background:#fbb
|52||May 25||@ Dodgers || 1–4 || Stripling (2–1) || Richard (3–6) || Jansen (11) || 44,612 || 21–31 || L1
|-style=background:#bfb
|53||May 26||@ Dodgers || 7–5 || Stammen (2–0) || Hudson (1–1) || Hand (16) || 43,920 || 22–31 || W1
|-style=background:#fbb
|54||May 27||@ Dodgers || 1–6 || Buehler (3–1) || Cimber (2–2) ||—|| 46,650 || 22–32 || L1
|-style=background:#fbb
|55||May 28|| Marlins || 2–7 || Smith (4–5) || Lauer (1–3) ||—|| 27,932 || 22–33 || L2
|-style=background:#bfb
|56||May 29|| Marlins || 9–5 || Stammen (3–0) || Straily (2–1) ||—|| 16,321 || 23–33 || W1
|-style=background:#bfb
|57||May 30|| Marlins || 3–2 || Strahm (1–2) || Ziegler (0–5) ||—|| 15,449 || 24–33 || W2
|-style=background:#bfb
|58||May 31|| Marlins ||8–3||Lyles (2–1)|| Chen (1–3)
||Hand (17)|| 17,373
|25–33|| W3
|-

|-style=background:#fbb
|59||June 1|| Reds || 2–7 || Mahle (4–6) || Lockett (0–1) || Lorenzen (1) || 25,729 || 25–34 || L1
|-style=background:#bfb
|60||June 2|| Reds || 8–2 || Lauer (2–3) || Harvey (1–4) || — || 31,710 || 26–34 || W1
|-style=background:#bfb
|61||June 3|| Reds || 6–3 || Ross (5–3) || Castillo (4–6) || Yates (1) || 25,377 || 27–34 || W2
|-style=background:#bfb
|62||June 4|| Braves || 11–4 || Richard (4–6) || Teherán (4–4) |||—|| 19,419 || 28–34 || W3
|-style=background:#fbb
|63||June 5|| Braves || 1–14 || Newcomb (7–1) || Lyles (2–2) || Jackson (1) || 21,049 || 28–35 || L1
|-style=background:#bfb
|64||June 6|| Braves || 3–1 || Castillo (1–0) || Foltynewicz (5–4) || Hand (18) || 20,898 || 29–35 || W1
|-style=background:#fbb
|65||June 8||@ Marlins || 0–4 || Smith (5–6) || Lauer (2–4) ||—|| 10,654 || 29–36 || L1
|-style=background:#bfb
|66||June 9||@ Marlins || 5–4 || Stammen (4–0) || Rucinski (1–1) || Yates (2) || 12,089 || 30–36 || W1
|-style=background:#bfb
|67||June 10||@ Marlins || 3–1 || Richard (5–6) || Ureña (1–8) || Hand (19) || 12,984 || 31–36 || W2
|-style=background:#fbb
|68||June 11||@ Cardinals || 2–5 || Flaherty (3–2) || Lyles (2–3) || Norris (13) || 40,971 || 31–37 || L1
|-style=background:#bfb
|69||June 12||@ Cardinals || 4–2 || Cimber (3–2) || Mikolas (7–2) || Hand (20) || 40,199 || 32–37 || W1
|-style=background:#bfb
|70||June 13||@ Cardinals || 4–2 || Lauer (3–4) || Weaver (3–6) || Hand (21) || 44,094 || 33–37 || W2
|-style=background:#fbb
|71||June 14||@ Braves || 2–4 || Sánchez (3–0) || Ross (5–4) || Vizcaíno (13) || 25,250 || 33–38 || L1
|-style=background:#cfc
|72||June 15||@ Braves || 9–3 || Richard (6–6) || Freeman (1–3) ||—|| 41,497 || 34–38 || W1
|-style=background:#fbb
|73||June 16||@ Braves || 0–1 || Newcomb (8–2) || Lyles (2–4) || Vizcaíno (14) || 41,916 || 34–39 || L1
|-style=background:#fbb
|74||June 17||@ Braves || 1–4 || Teherán (5–4) || Castillo (1–1) || Vizcaíno (15) || 40,251 || 34–40 || L2
|-style=background:#fbb
|75||June 19|| A's || 2–4 (10) || Trivino (4–1) || Cimber (3–3) || Treinen (16)|| 37,485 || 34–41 || L3
|-style=background:#fbb
|76||June 20|| A's || 4–12 || Montas (4–1) || Lucchesi (3–3) ||—|| 28,225 || 34–42 || L4
|-style=background:#fbb
|77||June 21||@ Giants || 0–3 || Bumgarner (1–2) || Ross (5–5) || Melancon (1)|| 37,497 || 34–43 || L5
|-style=background:#cfc
|78||June 22||@ Giants || 6–2 || Richard (7–6) || Stratton (8–5) ||—|| 40,546 || 35–43 || W1
|-style=background:#fbb
|79||June 23||@ Giants || 3–5 || Moronta (3–1) || Cimber (3–4) ||—|| 40,348 || 35–44 || L1
|-style=background:#fbb
|80||June 24||@ Giants || 2–3 (11) || Blach (5–5) || Hand (1–4) ||—|| 39,230 || 35–45 || L2
|-style=background:#fbb
|81||June 25||@ Rangers || 4–7 || Barnette (2–0) || Stammen (4–1) || Kela (19)|| 23,470 || 35–46 || L3
|-style=background:#cfc
|82||June 26||@ Rangers || 3–2 || Strahm (2–2) || Diekman (1–1) || Hand (22)|| || 36–46 || W1
|-style=background:#fbb
|83||June 27||@ Rangers || 2–5 || Minor (6–4) || Richard (7–7) || Kela (20)|| 21,365 || 36–47 || L1
|-style=background:#fbb
|84||June 29|| Pirates || 3–6 || Musgrove (3–3) || Lauer (3–5) || Vázquez (16) || 27,083 || 36–48 || L2
|-style=background:#cfc
|85||June 30|| Pirates || 4–3 || Lucchesi (4–3) || Williams (6–6) || Hand (23)|| 32,418 || 37–48 || W1
|-

|-style=background:#fbb
|86||July 1|| Pirates || 5–7 || Crick (1–1) || Ross (5–6) || Vázquez (17) || 32,099 || 37–49 || L1
|-style=background:#fbb
|87||July 3||@ A's || 2–6 || Pagan (2–0) || Richard (7–8) ||—|| 29,925 || 37–50 || L2
|-style=background:#fbb
|88||July 4||@ A's || 2–4 || Trivino (7–1) || Castillo (1–2) || Treinen (22) || 14,408 || 37–51 || L3
|-style=background:#cfc
|89||July 5||@ Diamondbacks || 6–3 || Lauer (4–5) || Miller (0–3) || Hand (24) || 17,982 || 38–51 || W1
|-style=background:#fbb
|90||July 6||@ Diamondbacks || 4–3 || Godley (10–6) || Lucchesi (4–4) || Boxberger (21) || 25,128||38–52 || L1
|-style=background:#fbb
|91||July 7||@ Diamondbacks || 5–20 || Delgado (1–0) || Ross (5–7) ||—|| 27,091 || 38–53 || L2
|-style=background:#cfc
|92||July 8||@ Diamondbacks || 4–3 (16) || Hand (2–4) || Mathis (0–1) || — || 24,869 || 39–53 || W1
|-style=background:#fbb
|93||July 9|| Dodgers || 2–8 || Kershaw (3–4) || Perdomo (1–3) ||—|| 28,110 || 39–54 || L1
|-style=background:#cfc
|94||July 10|| Dodgers || 4–1 || Lauer (5–5) || Hill ||—|| 26,272 || 40–54 || W1 
|-style=background:#fbb
|95||July 11|| Dodgers || 2–4 || Maeda (6–5) || Lucchesi (4–5) || Jansen (25) || 26,448 || 40–55 || L1
|-style=background:#fbb
|96||July 12|| Dodgers || 2–3 || Stripling (8–2) || Ross (5–8) || Jansen (26) || 29,595 || 40–56 || L2
|-style=background:#fbb
|97||July 13|| Cubs || 4–5 (10) || Strop (4–1) || Cimber (3–5) || Morrow (21)|| 38,988 || 40–57 || L3
|-style=background:#fbb
|98||July 14|| Cubs || 6–11 ||Hendricks (6–8) || Perdomo (1–4) || —|| 38,837 || 40–58 || L4
|-style=background:#fbb
|99||July 15|| Cubs || 4–7 || Lester (12–2) ||Lauer (5–6) || Morrow (22) || 37,672 || 40–59 || L5
| rowspan=3 |ASG || colspan=8 | 89th All-Star Game at Nationals Park in Washington, District of Columbia, United States || rowspan=3 | Box   
|-  bgcolor=ffbbbb  
| July 17 || colspan=2 |  NL All-Stars 6, AL All-Stars 8 (10) || Díaz  (SEA) || Stripling (LAD) || Happ (TOR) ||  43,843 ||AL 44–43–2
|- style="text-align:center; bgcolor="bbcaff"
| colspan=8 |Representing the Padres: Brad Hand 
|-style=background:#fbb
|100||July 20||@ Phillies || 5–11 || Davis (1–0) || Richard (7–9) || — || 30,034 || 40–60 || L6
|-style=background:#bbb
|–||July 21||@ Phillies || colspan=7 | Postponed (rain): Makeup date July 22
|-style=background:#cfc
|101||July 22 (1) ||@ Phillies || 10–2 || Ross (6–8) || Pivetta (6–8) ||—|| 29,392 || 41–60 || W1
|-style=background:#fbb
|102||July 22 (2) ||@ Phillies || 0–5 || Velasquez (6–8) || Perdomo (1–5) ||—|| 25,054 || 41–61 || L1
|-style=background:#cfc
|103||July 23||@ Mets || 3–2 || Lucchesi (5–5) || deGrom (5–5) || Yates (3) || 21,731 || 42–61 || W1
|-style=background:#fbb
|104||July 24||@ Mets || 3–6 || Wheeler (4–6) || Lauer (5–7) || — || 21,925 || 42–62 || L1
|-style=background:#fbb
|105||July 25||@ Mets || 4–6 || Oswalt (1–2) || Richard (7–10) || Swarzak (2) || 30,963 || 42–63 || L2
|-style=background:#fbb
|106||July 27|| Diamondbacks || 2—6 || Greinke (12–5) || Perdomo (1–6) ||—|| 34,725 || 42–64 || L3
|-style=background:#fbb
|107||July 28|| Diamondbacks || 4–9 || Bradley (3–2) || Maton (0–1) ||—|| 37,149 || 42–65 || L4
|-style=background:#fbb
|108||July 29|| Diamondbacks || 4–5 || Buchholz (4–1) || Lucchesi (5–6) || Boxberger (25) || 32,529 || 42–66 || L5
|-style=background:#fbb
|109||July 30|| Giants || 3–5 (12) || Smith (1–1) || Strahm (2–3) ||—|| 31,725 || 42–67 || L6
|-style=background:#fbb
|110||July 31|| Giants || 2–3(10) || Watson (4–4) || Maton (0–2) ||Smith (6) || 29,209 || 42–68 || L7
|-

|-style=background:#cfc
|111||August 2||@ Cubs || 6–1 || Erlin (2–3) || Chavez (0–1) ||—|| 40,714 || 43–68 || W1
|-style=background:#fbb
|112||August 3||@ Cubs || 4–5 || Quintana (10–7) || Ross (6–9) || Strop (6) || 40,894 || 43–69 || L1
|-style=background:#fbb
|113||August 4||@ Cubs || 4–5 || Hendricks (8–9) || Lockett (0–2) || Strop (7) || 40,855 || 43–70 || L2
|-style=background:#cfc
|114||August 5||@ Cubs || 10–6 || Stammen (5–1) || Edwards Jr. (3–2) ||—|| 41,136 || 44–70 || W1
|-style=background:#cfc
|115||August 7||@ Brewers || 11–5 || Strahm (3–3) || Hader (4–1) ||—|| 27,664 || 45–70 || W2
|-style=background:#fbb
|116||August 8||@ Brewers || 4–8 || Chacín (11–4) || Kennedy (0–1) ||—|| 32,355 || 45–71 || L1
|-style=background:#cfc
|117||August 9||@ Brewers || 8–4 || Yates (4–0) || Knebel (2–3) ||—|| 39,041 || 46-71 || W1
|-style=background:#cfc
|118||August 10|| Phillies || 2–0 || Nix (1–0) || Eflin (8–4) || Yates (4) || 26,306 || 47-71 || W2
|-style=background:#fbb
|119||August 11|| Phillies || 1–5 || Nola (13–3) || Lockett (0–3) ||—|| 35,098 || 47-72 || L1
|-style=background:#cfc
|120||August 12|| Phillies || 9–3 || Lucchesi (6–6) || Arrieta (9–7) ||—|| 26,930 || 48–72 || W1
|-style=background:#fbb
|121||August 13|| Angels || 3–6(10) || Bedrosian (4–2) || Stammen (5–2) ||—|| 22,609 || 48-73 || L1
|-style=background:#fbb
|122||August 14|| Angels || 3–7 || Barría (8–7) || Kennedy (0–2) ||—|| 21,747 || 48–74 || L2
|-style=background:#fbb
|123||August 15|| Angels || 2–3 || Alvarez (5–3) || Yates (4–1) || Parker (12) || 22,851 || 48-75 || L3
|-style=background:#fbb
|124||August 16|| Diamondbacks || 1–5 || Buchholz (6–2) || Nix (1–1) ||—|| 20,617 || 48–76 || L4
|-style=background:#fbb
|125||August 17|| Diamondbacks || 4–9 || Hirano (4–2) || Lucchesi (6–7) ||—|| 20,010 || 48–77 || L5
|-style=background:#cfc
|126||August 18|| Diamondbacks || 7–6 || Stammen (6–2) || Chafin (1–4) ||—|| 24,440 || 49–77 || W1
|-style=background:#fbb
|127||August 19|| Diamondbacks || 3–4 || Bradley (4–4) || Yates (4–2) || Boxberger (28) || 22,346 || 49–78 || L1
|-style=background:#cfc
|128||August 21||@ Rockies || 4–3|| Erlin (3–3) || Anderson (6–6) || Yates (5) || 27,862 || 50–78 || W1
|-style=background:#fbb
|129||August 22||@ Rockies || 2–6 || Gray (10–7) || Nix (1–2) ||—|| 28,966 || 50–79 || L1
|-style=background:#fbb
|130||August 23||@ Rockies || 3–4 || Rusin (1–2) || Yates (4–3) ||—|| 30,625 || 50–80 || L2
|-style=background:#fbb
|131||August 24||@ Dodgers || 1–11 || Hill (6–4) || Richard (7–11) ||—|| 47,559 || 50–81 || L3
|-style=background:#fbb
|132||August 25||@ Dodgers || 4–5(12) || Ferguson (4–2) || Stock (0–1) ||—|| 53,528 || 50–82 || L4
|-style=background:#fbb
|133||August 26||@ Dodgers || 3–7 || Ryu (4–1) || Erlin (3–4) ||—|| 43,252 || 50–83 || L5
|-style=background:#cfc
|134||August 28|| Mariners || 2–1 || Nix (2–2) || Hernández (8–12) || Yates (6) || 25,168 || 51–83 || W1
|-style=background:#cfc
|135||August 29|| Mariners || 8-3 || Lucchesi (7–7) || Ramírez (1–3) ||—|| 20,266 || 52–83 || W2
|-style=background:#cfc
|136||August 30|| Rockies || 3–2(13) || Stock (1–1) || Shaw (4–6) ||—|| 20,056 || 53–83 || W3
|-style=background:#cfc
|137||August 31|| Rockies || 7–0 || Kennedy (1–2) || Senzatela (4–5) ||—|| 21,408 || 54–83 || W4
|-

|-style=background:#fbb
|138||September 1|| Rockies || 2–4 || Gray (11–7) || Erlin (3–5) || Davis (37) || 35,779 || 54–84 || L1
|-style=background:#fbb
|139||September 2|| Rockies || 3–7 || Freeland (13–7) || Nix (2–3) ||—|| 28,883 || 54–85 || L2
|-style=background:#cfc
|140||September 3||@ Diamondbacks || 6–2 || Mitchell (1–3) || Godley (14–8) ||—|| 22,514 || 55–85 || W1
|-style=background:#fbb
|141||September 4||@ Diamondbacks || 0–6 || Ray (5–2) || Lucchesi (7–8) ||—|| 18,556 || 55–86 || L1
|-style=background:#cfc
|142||September 6||@ Reds || 6–2 || J. Castillo (2–2) || L. Castillo (8–12) || — || 14,303 || 56–86 || W1
|-style=background:#fbb
|143||September 7||@ Reds || 6–12 || Lorenzen (3–1) || Strahm (3–4) || — || 14,854 || 56–87 || L1
|-style=background:#fbb
|144||September 8||@ Reds || 2–7 (7)|| Harvey (7–8) || Erlin (3–6) || — || 20,977 || 56–88 || L2
|-style=background:#cfc
|145||September 9||@ Reds || 7–6 || Stammen (7–2) || Iglesias (2–4) || Yates (7) || 18,424 || 57–88 || W1
|-style=background:#cfc
|146||September 11||@ Mariners || 2–1 || Stammen (8–2) || Díaz (0–4) || Yates (8) || 13,388 || 58–88 || W2
|-style=background:#cfc
|147||September 12||@ Mariners || 5–4 || Lucchesi (8–8) || LeBlanc (8–4) || Yates (9) || 17,164 || 59–88 || W3
|-style=background:#fbb
|148||September 14|| Rangers || 0–4 || Méndez (2–1) || Erlin (3–7) || — || 22,740 || 59–89 || L1
|-style=background:#fbb
|149||September 15|| Rangers || 3–6 || Jurado (3–5) || Castillo (2–3) || Leclerc (11) || 28,833 || 59–90 || L2
|-style=background:#cfc
|150||September 16|| Rangers || 7–3 || Yates (5–3) || Springs  (0–1) || — || 22,242 || 60–90 || W1
|-style=background:#fbb
|151||September 17|| Giants || 2–4 || Suárez (7–11) || Mitchell (1–4) || Smith (13) || 23,653 || 60–91 || L1
|-style=background:#fbb
|152||September 18|| Giants || 4–5 || Dyson (4–3) || Stammen (8–3) || Smith (14) || 26,285 || 60–92 || L2
|-style=background:#cfc
|153||September 19|| Giants || 8–4 || Erlin (4–7) || Stratton (10–10) || — || 31,933 || 61–92 || W1
|-style=background:#cfc
|154||September 21||@ Dodgers || 5–3 || Lauer (6–7) || Stripling (8–5) || Yates (10) || 52,458 || 62–92 || W2
|-style=background:#fbb
|155||September 22||@ Dodgers || 2–7 || Hill (10–5) || Nix (2–4) || — || 53,536 || 62–93 ||  L1
|-style=background:#fbb
|156||September 23||@ Dodgers || 0–14 ||'Ryu (6–3) || Lucchesi (8–9) || — || 50,250 || 62–94 || L2
|-style=background:#cfc
|157||September 24||@ Giants || 5–0 || Mitchell (2–4) || Holland (7–9) || Yates (11) || 35,428 || 63–94 || W1
|-style=background:#fbb
|158||September 25||@ Giants || 4–5  || Melancon (1–3) || Wick (0–1) || — || 36,063 || 63–95 || L1
|-style=background:#cfc
|159||September 26||@ Giants || 3–2 || Díaz (1–0) || Kelly (0–3) || Yates (12) || 36,044 || 64–95 ||  W1
|-style=background:#cfc
|160||September 28|| Diamondbacks || 3–2 (15) || Brewer (1–0) || Andriese (3–7) || — || 28,055 || 65–95 || W2
|-style=background:#fbb
|161||September 29|| Diamondbacks || 4–5 || Godley (15–11) || Nix (2–5) || Hirano (3) || 28,024 || 65–96 || L1
|-style=background:#cfc
|162||September 30|| Diamondbacks || 4–3 || Castillo' (3–3) || Barrett (0–1) || — || 31,243 || 66–96 || W1
|-

|- style="text-align:center;"
| Legend:       = Win       = Loss       = PostponementBold = Padres team member

Farm systemUpdated as of September 24, 2016''

References

External links
San Diego Padres official site
2018 San Diego Padres at Baseball-Reference.com

San Diego Padres seasons
San Diego Padres
San Diego Padres